Francisco José Ameliach Orta (born 14 June 1963) is a Venezuelan retired military officer and politician who is vice president of the United Socialist Party of Venezuela (PSUV).

Political career
Born in Valencia, Ameliach was part of the 1992 Venezuelan coup d'état attempts led by Hugo Chávez, later in 1999 he retired of the National Armed Forces in order to be candidate to the National Constituent Assembly. In 2000 he joined the Fifth Republic Movement and was elected to the National Assembly on 6 January 2000. He was reelected in 2005. 

In 2008 Ameliach ran for the candidature for Governor of Carabobo but lost the primary election against Mario Silva. In 2012 he finally won the elections defeating incumbent Governor Henrique Salas Feo.

Sanctions
Ameliach has been sanctioned by several countries.

On 9 August 2017, the United States Department of the Treasury placed sanctions on Ameliach for his position in the Presidential Commission in the 2017 Constituent Assembly of Venezuela.

Months later on 22 September 2017, Canada sanctioned Ameliach due to rupture of Venezuela's constitutional order.

On 29 March 2018, Ameliach was sanctioned by the Panamanian government for his alleged involvement with "money laundering, financing of terrorism and financing the proliferation of weapons of mass destruction".

References

1963 births
Living people
People from Valencia, Venezuela
Fifth Republic Movement politicians
United Socialist Party of Venezuela politicians
Members of the National Assembly (Venezuela)
Speakers of the National Assembly (Venezuela)
Governors of Carabobo
People of the 1992 Venezuelan coup d'état attempts
Members of the Venezuelan Constituent Assembly of 1999
Members of the Venezuelan Constituent Assembly of 2017
Secretariat of the Presidency ministers of Venezuela